La Bruguière is a commune dating back to the Middle Ages in the Gard department in southern France.

Geography

Equidistant from the Cévennes and from the Mediterranean Sea, between the rivers of the Cèze and the Gardon, close to the larger cities of Avignon, Nimes and Alès, as well as Uzès, the village has been a historical center in the region for centuries. La Bruguière is essentially an agricultural village despite its small touristic interest.  It has a  population of 360 inhabitants.  There is no village cafe or commerce, but there are interesting medieval era stone buildings.

Population

Administration

Places and Monuments

 Belfry mounted on a 12th-century Roman tower.
 Maze of little alleys surrounding the old village.
 4 medieval stone lavoirs or wash-houses.

References

Communes of Gard